Osman Nuri Topbaş (born 1942) is a Turkish Sufi master and author who lives in Istanbul, Turkey. He is the spiritual leader of the Naqshbandi Sufi Order based in Kadıköy, İstanbul.

Biography
He was born in 1942 in Erenköy, İstanbul. His father is master Musa Topbaş, and his mother is the daughter of H. Fahri Kığılı, Mrs. Fatma Feride.

He is married and father of four children. His books are published online for free in 43 languages.

His Books

Some of his books have been translated into English:

 Islam: Spirit and Form
 Contemplation In Islam
 Prophet Muhammad Mustafa the Elect 1
 Prophet Muhammad Mustafa the Elect 2
 A Peacefulhome Paradise On Earth
 From The Examplary Manners Of The Friends Of Allah 1
 Tears of the Heart
 The Last Breath
 Muhammad: The Prophet of Mercy
 Hajj Mabrur And Umrah
 Principles from the Lives of the Four Rightly-Guided Caliphs
 Civilisation Of Virtues 1-2
 The Story of the Reed
 Ikhlas, Taqwa, Sincerity And Piety
 The Society Of The Age Of Bliss
 Sufısm
 The Exemplar Beyond Compare Muhammad Mustafa
 The Secret in the Love for God
 Endowment, Charity And Service In Islam 
 Such a Mercy He Was

References

External links
Osman Nuri Topbas, Osman Nuri Topbas's official website in English
Osman Nuri Topbas, Osman Nuri Topbas's official website in Turkish
Osman Nuri Topbash's books, Osman Nuri Topbash's books in 43 languages in PDF on this website. (Free download)
Osman Nuri Topbas, Blog en español sobre Osman Nuri Topbas Efendi

Turkish writers
20th-century Muslim scholars of Islam
1942 births
Living people
Imam Hatip school alumni